Admiral Collier may refer to:

Andrew Collier (1924–1987), Canadian Forces Maritime Command vice admiral
Francis Augustus Collier (1786–1849), British Royal Navy rear admiral
George Collier (1732–1795), British Royal Navy vice admiral